The Addrisi Brothers were an American pop duo from Winthrop, Massachusetts. The brothers themselves were Donald "Don" Addrisi (December 14, 1938 – ) and Richard "Dick" Addrisi (born ).

Biography
Both Don and Dick played parts in their family's acrobatic group, The Flying Addrisis. In the 1950s, they got in touch with Lenny Bruce about starting a singing career and moved to California. They auditioned for parts on the Mickey Mouse Club, but were rejected. Soon after, however, they signed to Del-Fi Records and recorded several singles. Aside from the modest chart hit "Cherrystone" (1959), these were not successes. Further releases from Imperial Records and Warner Bros. Records fared no better, so the pair began working more as songwriters.

The Addrisi Brothers biggest success as a songwriting duo was "Never My Love", a hit for The Association; the brothers themselves had a hit with it in 1977.  They also charted several more hit singles in the 1970s and composed the theme music for the television program, Nanny and the Professor. In 1977, they secured their biggest chart hit with "Slow Dancin' Don't Turn Me On", released on Buddah Records. They worked together until Don Addrisi died from pancreatic cancer in 1984. His ashes are interred, along with his parents, at Forest Lawn Memorial Park (Glendale). 

At present, Richard Addrisi lives in Buenos Aires, Argentina.

Discography

Albums
We've Got to Get It On Again (Columbia Records, 1972) U.S. No. 137
Addrisi Brothers (Buddah Records, 1977) U.S. No. 118
Ghost Dancer (Scotti Brothers Records / Atlantic Records, 1979)
Never My Love - The Lost Album Sessions (Varèse Sarabande)

Singles
"I'll Be True" / "Everybody Happy" (1958) Brad Label
"Cherrystone" (6/1959) U.S. No. 62
"Saving My Kisses" (1959)
"It's Love" (1959)
"Gonna See My Baby" (1959)
"What a Night for Love" (1960)
"The Dance Is Over" (1962)
"Love Me Baby" (1964)
"Little Miss Sad" (1964)
"Side by Side" (1965)
"Excuse Me" (Dick Addrisi, 1966)
"Time to Love" (1968)
"We've Got to Get It On Again" b/w "You Make It All Worthwhile" (1/1972) U.S. No. 25, AC No. 10; Canada No. 15, AC No. 32
"I Can Feel You" (5/1972) U.S. No. 110
"I Can Count on You" (1972)
"Somebody Found Her (Before I Lost Her)" (2/1974) U.S. AC No. 42
"Slow Dancin' Don't Turn Me On" (4/1977) U.S. No. 20, AC No. 34; Canada No. 34, AC No. 49
"Does She Do It Like She Dances" (9/1977) U.S. No. 74
"Never My Love" (12/1977) U.S. No. 80 AC No. 28
"Ghost Dancer" (8/1979) U.S. No. 45, AC No. 41; UK No. 57
"As Long as the Music Keeps Playing" (1979) (12" Promo)
"Red Eye Flight (You Can Always Come Home Again)" (1981)

References

Sibling musical duos
American pop music groups
Imperial Records artists
People from Winthrop, Massachusetts
Burials at Forest Lawn Memorial Park (Glendale)
Del-Fi Records artists
Columbia Records artists
Buddah Records artists
Scotti Brothers Records artists